Hara is a town in north-eastern Ethiopia. It is located in Guba Lafto woreda in the Amhara Region. In 2019, it had a population of 28,096.

References

Populated places in the Amhara Region